Revival is a novel by American writer  Stephen King, published on November 11, 2014 by Scribner.

Background information 
The novel was first mentioned by King on June 20, 2013, while doing a video chat with fans as part of promoting the then-upcoming Under the Dome TV series. During the chat King stated that he was halfway through writing his next novel, Revival. The novel was officially announced on February 12, 2014. An excerpt was included at the end of the paperback edition of King's Doctor Sleep, published on June 10, 2014. In an interview with Rolling Stone, King stated that Revival was inspired by Arthur Machen's The Great God Pan and Mary Shelley's Frankenstein, and, like several of King's preceding novels, he has had the idea for this novel since childhood.

Plot
When Charles Jacobs, a new Methodist minister, comes to town, young Jamie Morton is excited. Almost everyone in the tiny Maine hamlet comes to love Jacobs, his beautiful wife, and his young son. Jacobs runs weekly Ministry Youth Fellowship sessions for the town’s children where he shares his interest in electricity and inventions with them, his wife plays music for them and they play with his young son Morrie (although Jamie is clearly favored over all the other children by Jacobs). When Jamie’s older brother, Conrad, also known as "Con", is injured in a skiing accident, leaving him unable to speak and causing distress in the family due the costs of treatment, Jacobs asks Jamie to bring him over as he may be able to help him. When Jamie and his older sister Claire do so, Jacobs places a low-voltage belt around Con’s neck and to everyone’s amazement, Con is able to speak again almost immediately.

Things change all too suddenly when Mrs. Jacobs and her child die in a gruesome auto accident. Stricken with grief, the reverend denounces God and religion during a sermon and is banished from town. Jamie, devastated that Jacobs will be leaving, goes to see him before he leaves town, where he thanks him for what he did for Con but Jacobs claims it was purely a placebo effect.

Jamie grows up to become a musician and starts using heroin. While he was on tour, his band abandon him at a hotel after he misses several of their concerts due to his addiction. He goes to the hotel reception to try and pay for another night at the hotel but his card is maxed out. That night, he goes to a state fair in search of drugs but finds Charles Jacobs performing an act in front of a large audience called “Portraits in Lightning”. Jacobs asks a young woman called Cathy Morse to volunteer for the act, where she sits in a chair blindfolded while he takes her photograph and after a blue burst of light flashes all around the stage, a portrait of her appears on a plate. He then offers do the same for anyone else for a small price. Jacobs immediately recognises Jamie in the audience and Jamie soon passes out and wakes up in Jacobs’s camper van where he offers to “treat” Jamie’s condition with a small application of electricity when he is well enough. After being treated, Jamie experiences strange side effects, including sleepwalking and jabbing himself in the arm with sharp objects while in a fugue state, as if trying to inject heroin. Jacobs is also later assaulted by Cathy Morse’s father after he claimed Jacob’s portrait caused her to try and steal a pair of diamond earrings from a jeweler which lead to her getting arrested. Before Jacobs leaves town again, he sends Jamie to a man called Hugh Yates who gives him a job in a music recording studio.

Many years later, Yates calls Jamie into his office and they tell each other about their experiences of Jacobs’s treatments and the aftereffects of them (Yates had been cured of Ménière's disease many years before and had for a short time afterwards suffered blackouts and visions he calls “prismatics” where he could see colors shifting back and forth and felt like he could see into another world shortly after being treated). Yates shows Jamie a poster on a website where Jacobs is performing revival tours using electricity (although he is pretending to be a faith healer, using the power of God to heal others) and they go to one of his tours but Yates quickly leaves. When Jamie asks him what happened, he claimed he had a “prismatic” for the first time in a long time when Jacobs was healing people where he saw the people there as giant ants.

Jamie starts looking into the many others Jacobs has healed. As it turns out, many of them have experienced similar side effects and some have even killed themselves and others as a result (including Cathy Morse who recently took her own life). He later discovers that Jacobs has also been studying occult texts, such as De Vermis Mysteriis. Jamie tracks down Jacobs and goes to his house to confront him about his cures and tell him about the aftereffects the people he is healing have been experiencing but to his surprise, Jacobs knows about them all along and has been keeping track of them but claims that only a small number of people have significant after-effects and that he is no longer healing people. Jacobs offers to make Jamie his assistant and pay him a lot more than Yates is paying him but he refuses and leaves.

Several years later, Jamie receives a letter from Jacobs including a letter his childhood sweetheart Astrid has written to Jacobs claiming she has terminal cancer. Jacobs agrees to heal her, but only if Jamie will become his personal assistant for one last experiment. Jamie reluctantly agrees, and Astrid is cured. 

Jamie helps Jacobs prepare for his final experiment: Jacobs has discovered something he terms "secret electricity", an all-powerful energy source that he has been using to achieve his miraculous cures over the years. He now intends to harness a massive surge of this energy from a lightning rod and channel it into a terminally ill woman named Mary Fay, whom he has relocated to his lab. Jacobs' plan is to revive Mary Fay after her death, not in the conventional manner, but in the sense that she will be clinically dead and yet able to communicate with Jacobs and tell him of the afterlife and what fate befell his wife and child after their death.

The experiment works, but not in the way Jacobs intends. The revived Mary Fay does become a doorway to the afterlife, but to the horror of both Jacobs and Jamie, there is no Heaven and no reward for piety. Instead, the afterlife is revealed to be "The Null", a hellish dimension of chaos, where souls of the deceased are tormented by Ant creatures, who serve insane, Lovecraftian beings, the most powerful of which is known as "Mother". It is implied that humans are fed to Mother, as "she" has a claw made of human faces. Mother inhabits the body of Mary Fay, transforming her into a grotesque monster, and attempts to kill Jacobs. Jamie shoots Mother with Jacobs' gun, and she leaves Mary's body. A horrified Jacobs has a fatal stroke, and Jamie arranges his body to make it look like he shot Mary. Jamie flees the scene and relocates to Hawaii.  

Later, many of the people cured by Jacobs go insane and kill themselves and others, including Hugh Yates and Astrid who kills her partner and herself. Jamie, one of the few survivors of Jacobs' treatments, is left relying heavily on antidepressants. He recounts his vision of The Null to a psychiatrist, who does not believe him. He acknowledges and takes some small comfort in the possibility that the visions were "lies". However, the novel ends with Jamie going to visit his brother Con who has spent the last two years in a psychiatric hospital after attacking his partner (which Jamie blames on Jacobs’s treatment of Con’s injury decades before); as Jamie goes to leave, he sees a door calling his name and realises that one day he will die and have to face being trapped in The Null under the yoke of Mother.

Reception

Revival generally received positive reviews, with many critics noting the book's nods to classics of the horror genre, such as Mary Shelley's Frankenstein, Arthur Machen's The Great God Pan, and the cosmic-horror of H. P. Lovecraft.

Danielle Trussoni of The New York Times described Revival as "pure Stephen King ... reading Revival is experiencing a master storyteller having the time of his life." Trussoni noted that the book "is filled with cultural allusions both high and low: In addition to the Bible and Frankenstein, there are references to Thomas Edison's work at Menlo Park, Dan Brown, The X-Files, the Forbidden Books (that is, grimoires banned and burned by the Catholic Church) ... As the Kingian references pile up, and become layered into the events of the fictional world, you fall deeper and deeper under the story's spell, almost believing that Jamie's nightmarish experiences actually happened."

Elizabeth Hand, writing in The Washington Post also highlights Revivals influences: "King's restrained prose explodes in an ending that combines contemporary realism with cosmic horror reminiscent of H. P. Lovecraft's fiction and the classic film Quatermass and the Pit. The tormented relationship between Jamie Morton and Charles Jacobs takes on the funereal shading of an Arthur Miller tragedy." King's storytelling is praised as offering "the atavistic pleasure of drawing closer to a campfire in the dark to hear a tale recounted by someone who knows exactly how to make every listener's flesh crawl when he whispers, 'Don't look behind you.'"

Other reviews were less enthusiastic, with The Guardians Ben East describing Revivals ending as "a bit odd." East praises the story's beginning, but opined that "Revival takes a turn for the ridiculous" after moving past the protagonist's childhood. "In the context of a novel with so many interesting things to say about growing up and growing old in the 21st century, the more fantastical elements feel a little silly."

Tasha Robinson, writing for The A.V. Club, offered a similar criticism: "Virtually all of Revival is a slow build that sometimes feels suspiciously like a shaggy-dog story, one which may not have a punchline. ... Revival could have trimmed all the buildup and instead been an extremely unnerving short story. King's fans, familiar with his sprawling voice and comfortably compelling style, may be perfectly content to hang out with him on this leisurely stroll toward eventual horror."

Film adaptation
On February 2, 2016, it was announced that an adaptation for Revival was written by Josh Boone while he was working on adapting The Stand.  The script was being looked at by Universal Pictures and would be shopped around if the producers refused it. In December 2016, Boone announced that Russell Crowe was attached to star in the film.

On May 8, 2020, Deadline Hollywood confirmed that Mike Flanagan would adapt Revival for film in partnership with Intrepid Pictures. That July, Flanagan confirmed that he had completed the first draft of the screenplay, which was met with King's approval. However, he expressed doubt as to the likelihood of Warner Bros. greenlighting the project. On December 23, 2020, Flanagan confirmed that the adaptation was no longer in development, saying in conversation with Boone on the podcast The Company of the Mad, "I stepped on the exact same landmine, and ended up in the exact same place... We should get together some day and share boards, and drafts, and scars. I kind of hit the same wall with it where it was just so expensive. Man, did I love it, though."

References

External links
 Official page   on StephenKing.com
  Book review on Knigosearch.com
 Revival Review Paul Webster

Novels by Stephen King
2014 American novels
Science fiction horror novels
Religion in science fiction
Charles Scribner's Sons books